Open Media is a British television production company.

Open Media may also refer to:

 OpenMedia.ca, a Canadian non-partisan, non-profit advocacy organization 
 Open Media, a group including Open Russia, a political organisation in Russia founded by Mikhail Khodorkovsky
 Open Media Research Institute, archived by Blinken Open Society Archives

See also
 Open Society Foundations, a grantmaking network founded by George Soros